Werner Jäger (born September 3, 1959) is a former ice speed skater from Austria, who represented his native country at the 1984 Winter Olympics in Sarajevo, Yugoslavia

References

External links
 SkateResults

1959 births
Living people
Austrian male speed skaters
Speed skaters at the 1984 Winter Olympics
Olympic speed skaters of Austria
Place of birth missing (living people)
20th-century Austrian people